The Night Before is a 1988 American comedy film starring Keanu Reeves and Lori Loughlin. Reeves plays Winston Connelly, the so-called high school nerd and vice president of the astronomy club. Loughlin plays Tara Mitchell, the pretty and popular head cheerleader who also happens to be the local police chief's daughter. The Tagline was: "You lost your father's car, sold your prom date and a guy called 'Tito' wants you dead. It's a date that's the time of your life."

Plot 
Teen Winston regains consciousness in an alley in the middle of the night with no idea of how he got there. He's dressed in a white tuxedo jacket.

Through a series of flashbacks, he remembers that he was waylaid on his way to the prom the night before. In the meantime, he has to figure out what happened to his wallet, his car keys, his prom date, and why a pimp named "Tito" wants him dead.

Winston finds a parking stub in his pocket. "Danny Boy" offers to open, and then start the car. Naive, he agrees, but once Danny gets it started, he leaves with it.

At Tara's house to take her to the prom, she tells Winston that her losing a bet on a football game is why she has to go to prom with the flattered but clueless nerd Winston. Her police officer father warns him to take care of his one and only daughter and to have her home by midnight. 

Having gotten off the freeway and lost, Winston manages to get them lost in the ghetto in East LA. At a stop light, a man reaches through the driver's window to rob them, but they manage to shake him off after a few blocks. Unfortunately, he got Winston's wallet.

Going back to a bar he had been earlier, Winston remembers having been there with Tara.  The hooker Rhonda, who had warned him not to consume a 'free' drink from the bartender, greets his familiarly. 

Rhonda reminds Winston accidentally sold Tara to the diminutive pimp Tito for 1500 dollars, and then got thrown out of the bar, told to meet him at dawn to fight. 

Winston spends the remainder of the evening searching for Tara in the seedy underworld of East LA whilst seeking to avoid Tito's wrath after Tito discovers the identity of Tara's father.

Coming across a guy in the street, it turns out he was the lookout for a toy story robbery. Winston is used by the thieves to get away from the cops. In return, they help him with a lead. 

At a brothel, Winston finds out Tito sold Tara to another pimp, so he starts using the 1500 to locate her. He pays a Hispanic man to drive around, asking for her. Winston arrives at the hotel where she's being held for yet a third pimp, who's about to ship her to Morocco. 

In the end, Winston escapes with Tara from the pimp, recovers his dad's car from Danny Boy, who had planned to sell it to Tito and gets the girl (when she realises all that he did for her).

Cast 
 Keanu Reeves as Winston Connelly
 Lori Loughlin as Tara Mitchell
 Theresa Saldana as Rhonda
 Trinidad Silva as Tito
 Suzanne Snyder as Lisa

Production
It was filmed and set entirely in Los Angeles, California. Members of the group Parliament-Funkadelic appear in the film under the name the Rat's Nest Band.

External links
 
 
 

1980s teen comedy films
1988 films
American teen comedy films
Films about proms
Films about kidnapping
Films directed by Thom Eberhardt
1988 comedy films
1980s English-language films
1980s American films